The 1975 SCCA/USAC Formula 5000 Championship was the ninth running of the Sports Car Club of America's professional open wheel automobile racing series and the second to be sanctioned jointly by the Sports Car Club of America and the United States Automobile Club. The championship was open to cars complying with the SCCA's 5 litre (305 cid) American stock block engine specifications and to cars complying with the USAC's 161 cid turbocharged, 255 cid DOHC or 320 cid stock block engine regulations.

The 1975 SCCA/USAC Formula 5000 Championship was won by Brian Redman driving a Lola T332 Chevrolet.

In light of the Can Am Series' folding the previous year, the Formula 5000 Championship became the SCCA's flagship series in 1975. However, only two years later, the Formula 5000 category would form the basis for a revived Can Am Series. After 1975, Lola's dominance would end as March and Shadow cars would win events the following year. It would also be the end of Chevrolet's several year sweep of the championship as an engine manufacturer, as a Dodge powered car would garner a victory in 1976.

Calendar

The 1975 SCCA/USAC Formula 5000 Championship was contested over a nine race series.

Points system
Championship points were awarded on a 36-24-16-12-8-5-4-3-2-1 basis for the first ten positions in each race.

Championship standings

References

External links
My Formula 5000
Old Racing Cars Formula 5000 page

SCCA Continental Championship
SCCA USAC Formula 5000 Championship
Formula 5000